Wörth or Woerth may refer to:

Places

Germany 
Wörth am Main, Miltenberg district, Bavaria
Wörth am Rhein, Germersheim district, Rhineland-Palatinate
Wörth an der Donau, Regensburg district, Bavaria
Wörth an der Isar, Landshut district, Bavaria
Wörth, Upper Bavaria, Erding district, Bavaria
Donauwörth, Donau-Ries district, Bavaria
Wörth, Worthsee, an island in Lake Wörth, Bavaria, Germany

Elsewhere 
Wœrth, a town in Bas-Rhin, Alsace, France
Wörth Castle, Neuhausen am Rheinfall in the canton of Schaffhausen, Switzerland
Lake Wörth (disambiguation), multiple lakes

Other uses 
SMS Wörth, an 1892 ship of the German Navy
Battle of Wœrth, fought in 1870, near Wœrth, Alsace, France
Éric Woerth (born 1956), French politician